LATAM Argentina served the following destinations until it ceased operations on 17 June 2020.

References

LAN Airlines
Lists of airline destinations